I Don't Want to Know or I Don't Wanna Know may refer to:

Songs
"I Don't Want to Know" (1964), a single by Shirley and Johnny
"I Don't Want to Know" (1965), by The Zombies from the album Begin Here
"I Don't Want to Know" (1965), a B-side by Cilla Black from the single "I've Been Wrong Before"
"I Don't Want to Know" (1969), written by Jerry Herman from the musical Dear World
"Don't Want to Know" (1973), by John Martyn from the album Solid Air
"I Don't Want to Know" (1977), by Dr. Feelgood from the album Be Seeing You
"I Don't Want to Know" (1977), by Fleetwood Mac
"I Do' Wanna Know" (1984), by REO Speedwagon
"I Don't Wanna Know" (1985), by Phil Collins from the album No Jacket Required
"I Don't Want to Know" (1990), by Vaya Con Dios from the album Night Owls
"I Don't Wanna Know" (1994), by Katey Segal from the album Well...
"I Don't Want to Know" (1995), by Wet Wet Wet from the album Picture This
"I Don't Wanna Know" (1998), by Julian Lennon from the album Photograph Smile
"I Don't Wanna Know" (2000), a single by Wicked Beat Sound System
"I Don't Want to Know" (2003), by Matthew Sweet from the album Kimi Ga Suki
"I Don't Wanna Know" (2003), by Mario Winans, Enya and P. Diddy
"I Don't Want to Know (If You Don't Want Me)" (2004), by the Donnas from the album Gold Medal
"I Don't Wanna Know" (2004), by New Found Glory from the album Catalyst
"I Don't Want to Know!" (2004), by Reeve Oliver from the album Reeve Oliver
"I Don't Wanna Know" (2005), by Sheryl Crow from the album Wildflower
"Bliss (I Don't Wanna Know)" (2005), by Hinder from the album Extreme Behavior
"I Don't Wanna Know" (2007), by Kimberly Locke from the album Based on a True Story
"Don't Wanna Know" (2016), by Maroon 5 and Kendrick Lamar
"I Don't Wanna Know" (2019), by Charli XCX from the album Charli

Television
"I Don't Wanna Know" (2008), the tenth episode of True Bloods first season

See also
"I Want to Know" (1988), by Living Colour from the album Vivid